JustPark is a technology platform that matches drivers with parking spaces through its website and mobile application. JustPark, previously known as ParkatmyHouse, was founded in London in 2006 by Anthony Eskinazi.

As of 2013, the JustPark service was used by over 2.5 million drivers with 45,000 space owners across the UK. The company became the number one in the App Store and Play Store for the search term 'parking' in 2018.

JustPark is headquartered in London.

History
JustPark, originally known as ParkatmyHouse, was founded by Anthony Eskinazi in September 2006 after he had trouble parking for a baseball game in San Francisco.  In July 2011, the company raised venture capital from BMW i Ventures, the venture capital arm of BMW.

In January 2012, they launched a beta version of their website in the US.

In 2014, the company rebranded as JustPark raising further funding from Index Ventures in December of that year. JustPark was named by Management Today as one of the "Five British startups that came of age in 2014", alongside Just Eat, TransferWise, Funding Circle and CrowdCube.

In February 2015, JustPark launched an equity crowdfunding campaign to raise £1 million on major UK platform, CrowdCube. The campaign hit its target in four days, attracting a record-breaking number of investors, before overfunding to a total of £3.7m. In the same year, the company won Virgin Media Business's 'Pitch To Rich' (or '#VOOM') competition, with Sir Richard Branson on the judging panel.

In November 2015, Anthony Eskinazi took over as CEO from Alex Stephany who had been in position since December 2012.

In 2017, JustPark won the Parking Futures category at the British Parking Awards and the Guardian Small Business Showcase Award for Innovation in Funding.

In 2018, JustPark won the British Parking Award for Innovation for its Predictive Availability tool.

Business growth
The business started as a platform to allow property owners to make money from their underused spaces by opening them up to drivers looking for parking (similar to other sharing economy services, such as Airbnb).

Today JustPark is a platform for drivers to find, book and pay for parking via a 5-star rated app or through the website but the company has expanded to provide more than a simple peer-to-peer service.

JustPark's developments in cashless payment technology and digital pay-on-foot machines have allowed the company to enter the local authority parking market  securing contracts as the mobile payments provider for Wrexham County Borough Council and Cornwall Council.  As of 2018, JustPark partners with 14 local authorities.

The company also provides car park technology to over 300 hotels including Marriott and Hilton as well as to businesses in the property sectors including Savills and JLL.

Innovation and awards
Known for its tech-led innovations, JustPark has won awards for industry-first services designed to improve parking for drivers and space providers. JustPark’s Dynamic Pricing product won the 2017 British Parking Award for Parking Futures. This pricing model recommends pricing based on historic occupancy and search data, suggesting low rates to encourage drivers to park during off-peak and higher rates when spaces are in short supply.

JustPark’s Predictive Availability tool won the 2018 British Parking Award for Parking Innovation and the 2018 Smart Cities UK Award for data. Working with Westminster City Council and using machine learning algorithms and sensor data, JustPark built an industry first system for predicting the future availability of individual parking bays. The system is integrated with navigation apps (including Google Maps and Waze) to help drivers find a space en route.

JustPark was named Ones To Watch in 2018’s Sunday Times Tech Track 100. The company was the winner of Virgin Media Business's #VOOM competition and chosen as one of WIRED's hottest European start-ups.

JustPark was named no.95 in 2019's Sunday Times Tech Track 100.

References

External links 
 
 The winners and losers of the sharing economy, Hot Topics 2015

Parking companies
Internet properties established in 2006
Online companies of the United Kingdom
2006 software
IOS software